Qurnet Murai is a necropolis located on the West Bank of the Nile at Thebes, Egypt, just to the south of Sheikh Abd el-Qurna.

It was also used as a cemetery for officials of the New Kingdom administration in Thebes.

Tombs at Qurnet Murai
 TT40 - Amenhotep-Huy, Viceroy of Kush; reign of Tutankhamun
 TT221 - Hormin, Scribe of troops in the palace of the king on the West of Thebes; reign of Ramesses III
 TT222 - Heqamaatranakht called Turo, High priest of Monthu, 20th Dynasty
 TT223 - Karakhamon, first ka(?)-priest, Late Period
 TT235 - Userhet, High priest of Monthu, 20th Dynasty
 TT270 - Amenemwia, wab-priest, lector-priest of Ptah-Sokar, 19th Dynasty
 TT271 - Nay, Royal scribe, reign of Aye.
 TT272 - Khaemopet Divine Father of Amun in the west, lector-priest of the Sokar temple, Ramesside Period, 20th Dynasty
 TT273 - Sayemiotf, Scribe in the estate of his lord, Ramesside Period
 TT274 - Amenwahsu, High priest of Monthu of Tod and of Thebes, sem-priest in the Ramesseum in the estate of Amun, reign of Ramesses II - Merenptah, 19th dynasty
 TT275 - Sebekmose, Head wab-priest, Divine Father in the temples of king Amenhotep III and Sokar, Ramesside Period  
 TT276 - Amenemopet, Overseer of the treasury of gold and silver, Judge, Overseer of the cabinet, reign of Thutmose IV, 18th Dynasty
 TT277 - Amenemonet, Divine father in the reign of king Amenhotep III, 19th Dynasty
 TT278 - Amenemheb, Herdsman of Amun-Ra, Ramesside Period, 20th Dynasty
 TT380 - Ankhefen-Re-Horakhty, Chief in Thebes, Ptolemaic Period
 TT381 - Amenemonet, Messenger of the King to every land, reign of Ramesses II
 TT382 - Usermontu, First Prophet of Monthu, reign of Ramesses II
 TT383 - Merymose, Viceroy of Kush, reign of Amenhotep III

See also
 List of Theban Tombs

Theban tombs